The Shropshire County Cricket League is a league cricket competition based in the county of Shropshire, England.

It began in 2012, succeeding the Shropshire Premier Cricket League and the Shropshire Cricket League which were wound up at the end of the 2011 season.

The league comprises: Premier Division, Divisions 1, 2, 3, 4, Reserve Divisions 1, 2, 3 and Sunday Divisions 1 and 2.

References

External links
 Official league website

Cricket in Shropshire